S.H.E Is the one was released on 4 March 2011 on Blu-ray and DVD and features the Taipei stop of their S.H.E Is the One Concert Tour. It also includes a bonus DVD of behind the scenes, video messages from their mothers, Selina's wedding proposal and their KTV music videos.

The live album received "Top 1 Selling Mandarin Albums of the Year" in the IFPI Hong Kong Album Sales Awards 2012.

Track listing
The concert had each member perform two solos. Selina and Hebe sang English songs for one of their solos while Ella sang a self-penned song. They performed different versions on some of their songs and the concert also featured songs from their Shero album.

Song List
Overture:"S. H. E Is the one"
"Super Star"
"Boom"
"Super Model"
"Miss Universe" (宇宙小姐)
"Planet 612" (612星球)
"Tropical Rainforest" (熱帶雨林)
"Grey Sky" (天灰)
"Mayday" (五月天)
"How are you doing recently" (最近還好嗎)
"Flowers Have Blossomed" (花都開好了)
"I Love Rainy Night Flower" (我愛雨夜花)
"London Bridge Is Falling Down" (倫敦大橋垮下來)
"How to do" (怎麼辦)
"Long Live Adorableness" (可愛萬歲)
"VCR of Ella's Adventure Story" (Ella的冒險故事VCR)
"Dream a little dream of me" (Hebe solo)
"Wake me up before you go-go" (Selina solo)
"I am who I am" (我就是我) (Ella solo)
"Electric Shock" (觸電)(Broadway Version)
"Love So Right" (愛就對了)
"Daybreak" (天亮了)
"Half Sugarism" (半糖主義)
"I Love Trouble" (我愛煩惱)
"Piquancy" (痛快)
"VCR of Three Little Girls' Wishes" (三個小女孩的願望VCR)
"The Angel is Singing Intro"+"Golden Shield, Iron Cloth"+"Dreamland" (天使在唱歌Intro+金鐘罩鐵布衫＋夢田)
"Happy Birthday to ELLA"
"Wife" (老婆)
"Simple love" (簡單愛) (Ella solo)
"Admiration" (崇拜) (Selina solo)
"Book of Exhilaration" (笑忘書) (Hebe solo)
"Loneliness Terminator"＋"Three Days and Nights" (終結孤單＋三天三夜)
Taiwanese Hokkien Suite:"Tea"＋"Mother, Please Take Care"＋"Farewell to the Seacoast"＋"Huan Xi Jiu Hao"＋"S.H.E's Mothers' Debuts" (台語組曲:茶噢＋媽媽請妳也保重＋惜別的海岸＋歡喜就好+熟女版S. H. E的初登場)
"Magic" (魔力) (S. H. E with you)
"I. O. I. O"
"Persian Cat" (波斯貓)
"Don't Wanna Grow Up" (不想長大)
"Beauty Up My Life"
"Remember"
"Genesis" (美麗新世界)
Encore
"Chinese" (中國話)
"SHERO"
Encore Again
"You Won't Be" (你不會)
"Where's Love" (愛呢)
"Loving You" (愛上你)
"Faraway" (遠方)
"It's Quiet Now" (安靜了)
"Not Yet Lovers" (戀人未滿)
Credit

References

S.H.E albums
HIM International Music albums
2011 video albums